Shell Castle is a historic plantation house located near Enfield, Halifax County, North Carolina. It was built between 1790 and 1802, and is a -story, five bay, Georgian-style frame dwelling with a two-story rear ell. It is sheathed in beaded siding and has a gable roof.

It was listed on the National Register of Historic Places in 1973.

References

Plantation houses in North Carolina
Houses on the National Register of Historic Places in North Carolina
Georgian architecture in North Carolina
Houses completed in 1802
Houses in Halifax County, North Carolina
National Register of Historic Places in Halifax County, North Carolina